McVicar or MacVicar is a surname. Notable people with the surname include:

McVicar:
Colin McVicar (1916–1987), New Zealand cricketer
David McVicar (born 1967), Scottish opera and theatre director
 Ewan McVicar, Scottish dance music producer and disc jockey
Hannah McVicar, British illustrator and printmaker
Jack McVicar (born 1904), Canadian professional ice hockey player
Jekka McVicar, English organic gardening expert
John McVicar (born 1940), British journalist, formerly an armed robber
Neil McVicar (politician), Canadian politician
Nelson McVicar (1871–1960), American federal judge
Rob McVicar (born 1982), Canadian professional ice hockey player

MacVicar:
Angus MacVicar (1908–2001), Scottish author
Margaret MacVicar (1944–1991), American physicist and educator
Sheila MacVicar, Canadian television journalist

Macvicar:
Anne Macvicar Grant (1755–1838), American-Scottish author

See also
McVicar (film), a 1980 British drama film
McVicar (album), the soundtrack album for the above film
McVicar's Bus Services, a defunct bus company in Sydney, Australia
McVicker (surname)

Surnames of British Isles origin